Rampisham ( or ) is a village and civil parish in the county of Dorset in southern England, situated approximately  northwest of the county town Dorchester. The village is sited on greensand in a valley surrounded by the chalk hills of the Dorset Downs. The parish includes the hamlet of Uphall northwest of the main village.

Dorset County Council's 2013 mid-year estimate for the population of Rampisham parish is 110. The principal means of making a living is agricultural, mainly grain production.

History

In the Domesday Book in 1086 Rampisham was recorded as Ramesham. It was in the hundred of Tollerford, had seventeen households and the tenant-in-chief was Bishop Odo of Bayeaux.

Rampisham's parish church, dedicated to St Michael and All Saints, has a medieval south tower which was built in phases in the early 14th (1326) and 15th centuries. The rest of the building was largely rebuilt in two bouts of Victorian restoration: first in 1845–7 and then in 1858–60. Augustus Pugin was involved in the first restoration, designing a new east window and chancel. He also built a a rectory for the village, though this is now a private house. The second restoration involved an extension to the tower and a rebuilding of the nave; this was undertaken by John Hicks, possibly with assistance from a young Thomas Hardy.

A quarter of a mile north-northeast of the church is the base and part of the shaft of a 15th-century wayside cross.

Geography

Communications station
In November 1939 the BBC acquired  of land on Rampisham Down, a hill southwest of the village. It became the location of one of the main transmitters of the BBC World Service in Europe until it was shut in 2011.  There were 26 transmitter pylons on the down.

References

External links

 mb21 - BBCWS Transmitter Site
 Image of Merlin - BBCWS Relay Station Signage - http://tx.mb21.co.uk/gallery/rampisham/rampisham-mc-04.jpg

Villages in Dorset